Vicente Ramón Roca Rodríguez (2 September 1792 – 23 February 1858) was President of Ecuador from 8 December 1845 to 15 October 1849. He was a member of the Liberal Party. He led the revolution that overthrew Juan José Flores, along with José Joaquín de Olmedo and Diego Noboa. He ruled under the Constitution of 1845.

References

 Roca, Vicente Ramón. treccani.it

Roca
Roca
Roca
Ecuadorian Radical Liberal Party politicians
People from Guayaquil
19th-century Ecuadorian people